Dragoslav Papić (born 17 March 1987) is a Serbian professional basketball player who last played as a Power forward for KK Crvena Zvezda of the Basketball League of Serbia.

External links 
 Profile at realgm.com
 Profile at eurobasket.com

1987 births
Living people
AEL Limassol B.C. players
AZS Koszalin players
Basketball League of Serbia players
Basketball players from Belgrade
BC Rilski Sportist players
KK Crnokosa players
KK Kolubara players
KK Vršac players
KK Zlatibor players
Serbian expatriate basketball people in Bulgaria
Serbian expatriate basketball people in Cyprus
Serbian expatriate basketball people in Poland
Serbian expatriate basketball people in Romania
Serbian men's basketball players
Power forwards (basketball)